Sammie Harris (born 1939) is an American-born Canadian football player who played for the Edmonton Eskimos.

References

Living people
1939 births
Edmonton Elks players